The 1925 Gonzaga Bulldogs football team was an American football team that represented Gonzaga University during the 1925 college football season. In their first year under head coach Maurice J. "Clipper" Smith, the Bulldogs compiled a 7–2–2 record, shut out five of 11 opponents, and outscored all opponents by a total of 203 to 68.

Schedule

References

Gonzaga
Gonzaga Bulldogs football seasons
Gonzaga Bulldogs football